Rousimar Christian Palhares (born February 20, 1980) is a Brazilian mixed martial artist currently competing in the Welterweight division of Absolute Championship Akhmat (ACA). A professional competitor since 2006, he has competed for the Ultimate Fighting Championship (UFC), World Series of Fighting (WSOF), and Konfrontacja Sztuk Walki (KSW). His nickname Toquinho, Portuguese for "little tree stump", comes from his short, stocky, heavily muscled build and the low success rate his opponents have had in grappling him down to the canvas. Palhares is primarily known for his powerful ground game. Of his 16 submission victories 12 have come from leg locks. He is also known for his refusal to release submission holds when either the opposing fighter has signaled submission or the referee has called a stop to the bout, causing him to be fired by the UFC, and WSOF.

Early life
Palhares grew up in abject poverty in the Brazilian countryside. He recalls working in the fields to help support his family as young as age seven and said that there were times where there was not enough food for everyone. He eventually had to leave his shanty and move underneath a local bridge in a tent city slum. Palhares began training in Brazilian jiu-jitsu at the age of 15, before moving to Rio de Janeiro to compete professionally.
  
He claimed the Fury Fighting Championship Middleweight Championship in December 2007 after defeating Flavio Mura, Pan-Am Jiu-Jitsu champion Fabio Negao, and Chute Boxe's Daniel Acacio in a tournament.

Palhares earned his Brazilian Jiu-Jitsu black belt under former UFC Middleweight Champion Murilo Bustamante and Bebeo Duarte. Experts in martial arts touted Palhares as one of the most naturally gifted grapplers today.

Having spent his entire early career competing in Brazil, Palhares's first bout outside his home country was in the United States at UFC 84. He is considered to be one of the best in the world at leg locks, such as the heel hook and kneebar.
Palhares took 2nd place in the under 88 kg 2011 ADCC, finishing his first three opponents quickly with leg locks, before losing to established World Champion Andre Galvao in the final, by points.

Mixed martial arts career

Ultimate Fighting Championship

Middleweight

Palhares fought against former PRIDE Middleweight & Welterweight Champion Dan Henderson at UFC 88. Henderson defeated Palhares by unanimous decision handing Palhares his first loss in the UFC.

Palhares quickly rebounded from the loss to defeat veteran Jeremy Horn at UFC 93 by unanimous decision. Palhares was expected to face Italian Alessio Sakara on December 5, 2009, at The Ultimate Fighter 10 Finale, but due to an injury while training, Sakara had to withdraw. On December 12, 2009, at UFC 107 Palhares fought against Lucio Linhares and defeated Linhares by heel hook.

At UFC 111, Palhares defeated Tomasz Drwal by heel hook 45 seconds into the first round. He was, however, subsequently suspended for 90 days for continuing to crank the submission even after Drwal had tapped and referee Kevin Mulhall stepped in to stop the fight.

Palhares was expected to face Nate Marquardt on August 28, 2010, at UFC 118, however the bout was moved to September 15, 2010, to headline UFC Fight Night 22 after Alan Belcher was forced to pull out of his bout with Demian Maia with an eye injury. Marquardt defeated Palhares via first round TKO. During the fight, Palhares claimed that Marquardt had greased his leg after failing to secure a leg lock on the ground. Marquardt attacked, catching Palhares off guard as he was complaining to the referee and won the fight through a ground-and-pound stoppage. Palhares would later apologize for his actions during the fight after it was determined by officials that Marquardt's leg was not greased.

Palhares was expected to face Alexandre Ferreira on March 3, 2011, at UFC Live: Sanchez vs. Kampmann. However, on January 18, Ferreira was dismissed from Chute Boxe Academy, his home training camp, for a "lack of commitment." Less than an hour later, it was reported that the fight had been cancelled due to Ferreira losing family and friends in the Brazilian floods, resulting in him being in "no condition to train or fight." David Branch replaced Ferriera. Palhares defeated Branch via second round submission (kneebar).

Palhares/Ferreira was expected to take place on August 27, 2011, at UFC 134. However, Ferreira was forced out of the bout with an injury and replaced by Dan Miller. Palhares would defeat Miller by unanimous decision, although there was some controversy when Palhares dropped Miller in the first round and after a few follow up punches, incorrectly thought the fight was over.

Palhares next faced Mike Massenzio on January 14, 2012, at UFC 142  He defeated Massenzio by heel hook in the first round, earning him his second Submission of the Night bonus.

Palhares then faced Alan Belcher on May 5, 2012, at UFC on Fox 3. After getting the fight to the ground, Palhares was almost caught on a twister attempt by Belcher.  Palhares was able to escape and proceeded to attempt various types of leglocks, which were all defended by Belcher.  After some action, Palhares ended on his back, eventually succumbing to Belcher's ground and pound at 4:18 of the first round.

Palhares was expected to replace an injured Luiz Cane against Yushin Okami on August 11, 2012, at UFC 150. However Palhares himself was injured and forced out of the bout.

Palhares faced Héctor Lombard on December 15, 2012, at UFC on FX 6 where he lost via KO at 3:38 of Round 1. Following his loss to Lombard, the UFC announced that Palhares tested positive for elevated testosterone levels in his post-fight drug test and, subsequently, has been suspended for nine-months retroactive to December 14.

Drop to Welterweight and release from the UFC
Following his loss to Lombard, Palhares stated that he would be moving down one weight class to the welterweight division.  He made his debut in the new division against Mike Pierce on October 9, 2013, at UFC Fight Night 29. He won the fight via heel hook submission just 31 seconds into the first round. This was the only successful submission throughout the event.  However, Palhares was denied a Submission of the Night bonus because he continued cranking the heel hook after the referee stepped in, an act UFC deemed "unsportsmanlike conduct."  It was also noted that Pierce tapped a total of eight times to no response from Palhares. The next day, while conducting an interview with ESPN's Jeremy Schaap, UFC president Dana White announced that the UFC was releasing Palhares effective immediately due to not letting go of the submission.  Hours later, UFC and Zuffa released a statement saying that Palhares was already in trouble for his failure to release his heel hook on Drwal in 2010 and his drug suspension in 2012, and his actions the night before were the last straw.

World Series of Fighting
In November 2013, Palhares signed a contract with World Series of Fighting, but was already on thin ice as WSOF president Ray Sefo had given Palhares a very stern warning about in-cage conduct.

Palhares made his WSOF debut at WSOF 9 against the reigning Welterweight Champion Steve Carl. He won via inverted heel hook submission in the first round to win the WSOF Welterweight Championship.

In July, he was scheduled to fight Jon Fitch at WSOF 11. However, on April 30, 2014, the match was canceled.  The fight with Jon Fitch was rescheduled for WSOF 16 on December 13, 2014. Palhares successfully defended his title, winning by kneebar only 90 seconds into first round. Again the length of the submission hold came into question.

Palhares faced Jake Shields on August 1, 2015, at WSOF 22. Shields did well against Palhares for the majority of the fight, but the tables began to turn in the 2nd round with a takedown by Palhares and the subsequent damage Palhares did on the ground. In the 3rd round, Palhares submitted Shields via kimura, but faced penalty from the NSAC soon after for once again holding on to a submission after being prompted to let it go by the referee, and for repeatedly eye-gouging Shields. Palhares came to the press one day after the incident and claimed innocence.

Following the incident, Palhares was stripped of his welterweight title and suspended indefinitely, with WSOF vice-president Ali Abdel-Aziz saying that Palhares "has mental problems and shouldn’t be allowed to fight until he fixes them."

Independent promotions
After the release from the WSOF, Palhares compiled a record of 1–4–1 in Italian, Polish and Russian promotions, losing two championship fights in the process.

On July 28, 2020, it was announced that Palhares had signed a contract with Taura MMA. Initially, he was expected to make his promotional debut against Sean Loeffler at Taura MMA 11 on October 30, 2020. However, on September 8, 2020, news surfaced that the bout was rescheduled to take place at Taura MMA 10 on October 23, 2020. Reports surfaced in the week leading up to this fight that Loeffler was forced to withdraw and was quickly replaced with Anthony Gordillo instead. In turn, Gordillo was not able to leave his hometown due to COVID-19 restrictions and the bout was cancelled.

Absolute Championship Akhmat
Palhares faced Ibragim Magomedov at ACA 140 on June 17, 2022, losing the bout via first round TKO stoppage.

Palhares faced Anatoliy Boyko on December 16, 2022, at ACA 149, losing the bout after he got TKOd in the first round.

Professional grappling career
Palhares competed at BJJ Bet 2 on August 1, 2021 in a no gi grand prix. He lost in the opening round to William Tackett on points.

Championships and accomplishments
Ultimate Fighting Championship
Submission of the Night (Two times)
World Series of Fighting
WSOF Welterweight Championship (One time)
Two successful title defense

Mixed martial arts record 

|-
|Loss
|align=center|19–12–1
|Anatoliy Boyko
|TKO (punches)
|ACA 149: Vagaev vs Slipenko
|
|align=center|1
|align=center|3:52
|Moscow, Russia
|
|-
|Loss
|align=center|19–11–1
|Ibragim Magomedov
|TKO (punches)
|ACA 140: Ramos vs. Reznikov
|
|align=center|1
|align=center|2:09
|Sochi, Russia
|
|-
| Loss
| align=center|
| Georgy Kichigin
| KO (punches)
| Russian Cagefighting Championship 5
| 
| align=center| 1
| align=center| 3:53
| Ekaterinburg, Russia
|
|- 
| Loss
| align=center|19–9–1
| Aliaskhab Khizriev
| KO (punches)
| Fight Nights Global 85: Alikhanov vs. Kopylov
| 
| align=center| 1
| align=center| 0:58
| Moscow, Russia
|
|-
|Draw
|align=center|19–8–1
|Shamil Amirov
|Draw (overturned)
|Fight Nights Global 73: Aliev vs. Brandão
|
|align=center|3
|align=center|5:00
|Kaspiysk, Russia
|
|-
|Win
|align=center|19–8
|Aleksei Ivanov
|Submission (heel hook)
|Fight Nights Global 70: Palhares vs. Ivanov
|
|align=center|1
|align=center|0:37
|Ulan-Ude, Russia
|
|-
| Loss
|align=center|18–8
|Michał Materla
|KO (punches)
|KSW 36: Materla vs. Palhares
|
|align=center|2
|align=center|1:27
|Zielona Góra, Poland
|
|-
| Loss
|align=center|18–7
|Emil Weber Meek
|KO (punches and elbows)
|Venator FC 3
|
|align=center|1
|align=center|0:45
|Milan, Italy
|
|-
|Win
|align=center|18–6
|Jake Shields
|Submission (kimura)
|WSOF 22
|
|align=center|3
|align=center|2:02
|Las Vegas, Nevada, United States
|
|-
|Win
|align=center|17–6
| Jon Fitch
| Submission (kneebar)
| WSOF 16
| 
|align=center|1
|align=center|1:30
| Sacramento, California, United States
| 
|-
|Win
|align=center|16–6
| Steve Carl
| Submission (inverted heel hook)
| WSOF 9
| 
|align=center|1
|align=center|1:09
| Las Vegas, Nevada, United States
| 
|-
| Win 
|align=center|15–6
| Mike Pierce
| Submission (heel hook)
| UFC Fight Night: Maia vs. Shields
| 
|align=center|1
|align=center|0:31
| Barueri, Brazil
| 
|-
| Loss
|align=center|14–6
| Héctor Lombard
| KO (punches)
| UFC on FX: Sotiropoulos vs. Pearson
| 
|align=center|1
|align=center|3:38
| Gold Coast, Australia
| 
|-
| Loss
|align=center|14–5
| Alan Belcher
| TKO (punches and elbows)
| UFC on Fox: Diaz vs. Miller
| 
|align=center|1
|align=center|4:18
| East Rutherford, New Jersey, United States
| 
|-
| Win
|align=center| 14–4
| Mike Massenzio
| Submission (heel hook)
| UFC 142
| 
|align=center|1
|align=center|1:03
| Rio de Janeiro, Brazil
| 
|-
| Win
|align=center| 13–4
| Dan Miller
| Decision (unanimous)
| UFC 134
| 
|align=center| 3
|align=center| 5:00
|Rio de Janeiro, Brazil
| 
|-
| Win
|align=center| 12–4
|  David Branch
| Submission (kneebar)
| UFC Live: Sanchez vs. Kampmann
| 
|align=center| 2
|align=center| 1:44
|Louisville, Kentucky, United States
| 
|-
| Loss
|align=center| 11–4
|  Nate Marquardt
| TKO (punches)
| UFC Fight Night: Marquardt vs. Palhares
| 
|align=center| 1
|align=center| 3:28
|Austin, Texas, United States
|
|-
| Win
|align=center| 11–3
|  Tomasz Drwal
| Submission (heel hook)
| UFC 111
| 
|align=center| 1
|align=center| 0:45
|Newark, New Jersey, United States
| 
|-
| Win
|align=center| 10–3
|  Lucio Linhares
| Submission (heel hook)
| UFC 107
| 
|align=center| 2
|align=center| 3:21
|Memphis, Tennessee, United States
|
|-
| Win
|align=center| 9–3
| Jeremy Horn
| Decision (unanimous)
| UFC 93
| 
|align=center| 3
|align=center| 5:00
|Dublin, Ireland
| 
|-
| Loss
|align=center| 8–3
|  Dan Henderson
| Decision (unanimous)
| UFC 88
| 
|align=center| 3
|align=center| 5:00
|Atlanta, Georgia, United States
| 
|-
| Win
|align=center| 8–2
|  Ivan Salaverry
| Submission (armbar)
| UFC 84
| 
|align=center| 1
|align=center| 2:36
|Paradise, Nevada, United States
| 
|-
| Win
|align=center| 7–2
|  Daniel Acacio
| Submission (heel hook)
| Fury FC 5: Final Conflict
| 
|align=center| 1
|align=center| 1:22
|São Paulo, Brazil
| 
|-
| Win
|align=center| 6–2
|  Fabio Nascimento
| Submission (heel hook)
| Fury FC 5: Final Conflict
| 
|align=center| 1
|align=center| 2:45
|São Paulo, Brazil
|
|-
| Win
|align=center| 5–2
|  Flavio Luiz Moura
| Submission (inverted heel hook)
| Fury FC 4: High Voltage
| 
|align=center| 1
|align=center| 1:21
|Teresopolis, Brazil
|
|-
| Win
|align=center| 4–2
|  Helio Dipp
| Submission (rear naked choke)
| Floripa Fight 3
| 
|align=center| 1
|align=center| 1:40
|Florianópolis, Brazil
|
|-
| Win
|align=center| 3–2
|  Claudio Mattos
| Submission (heel hook)
| Storm Samurai 12
| 
|align=center| 1
|align=center| 4:58
|Curitiba, Brazil
| 
|-
| Loss
|align=center| 2–2
|  Arthur Cesar Jacintho
| Decision (majority)
| Rio MMA Challenger 2
| 
|align=center| 3
|align=center| 5:00
|Rio de Janeiro, Brazil
| 
|-
| Win
|align=center| 2–1
|  Renan Moraes
| Submission (armbar)
| Gold Fighters Championship 1
| 
|align=center| 1
|align=center| N/A
|Rio de Janeiro, Brazil
| 
|-
| Win
|align=center| 1–1
|  Bruno Bastos
| Decision (split)
| Floripa Fight 2
| 
|align=center| 3
|align=center| 5:00
|Florianópolis, Brazil
| 
|-
| Loss
|align=center| 0–1
| Leandro Silva
| Decision (unanimous)
| Banni Fight Combat 2
| 
|align=center| 3
|align=center| 5:00
|Brasilia, Brazil
|

Grappling record
{| class="wikitable sortable" style="font-size:80%; text-align:left;"
|-
| colspan=8 style="text-align:center;" | 7 Matches, 3 Wins (3 Submissions), 4 Losses, 1 Draw
|-
!  Result
!  Rec.
!  Opponent
!  Method
!  text-center|  Event
!  Division
!  Date
!  Location
|-
|Loss||4–4–1||  Gordon Ryan || Referee Decision || World Jiu-Jitsu Festival|| Superfight||October 6, 2019||Long Beach, CA
|-
|Loss||4–3–1||  Craig Jones|| Referee Decision || Kasai Pro 3 || Superfight||  ||  New York City, NY
|-
|Draw||4–2–1||  Garry Tonon|| Draw || Polaris 3 || Superfight||  ||  Poole
|-
|Loss|| 4–2 ||  André Galvão|| Points (4–9) || rowspan=4|ADCC World championship || rowspan=4|-88kg||  rowspan=2| || rowspan=4| Nottingham
|-
|Win|| 4–1 ||  Rafael Lovato Jr.|| Submission (heel hook)
|-
|Win|| 3–1 ||  David Avellan|| Submission (heel hook) ||  rowspan=2|
|-
|Win|| 2–1 ||  Dan Schon|| Submission (heel hook)
|-
|Loss||  1–1||  Tarsis Humphreys|| Points (4–9) || rowspan=4|ADCC World championship || rowspan=4|-88kg||  rowspan=2| || rowspan=2| Rio de Janeiro

See also
 List of current mixed martial arts champions
 List of male mixed martial artists
 List of Brazilian Jiu-Jitsu practitioners

References

External links 

Official UFC Profile

Brazilian male mixed martial artists
Brazilian sportspeople in doping cases
Doping cases in mixed martial arts
Welterweight mixed martial artists
Middleweight mixed martial artists
Mixed martial artists utilizing Brazilian jiu-jitsu
Mixed martial artists utilizing catch wrestling
Mixed martial artists utilizing Luta Livre
Brazilian practitioners of Brazilian jiu-jitsu
People awarded a black belt in Brazilian jiu-jitsu
Brazilian catch wrestlers
1980 births
Living people
Sportspeople from Minas Gerais
Ultimate Fighting Championship male fighters